The American Equestrian Trade Association (AETA) is a not-for-profit (501-C6) trade organization founded in 2007. Association membership consists of 370 organizations involved with manufacturing, distribution and retailing of products for horses and riders.

The association sponsors semi-annual trade shows.  Current AETA International Trade Shows are held in Oaks, PA, others have been held in Baltimore, MD.  AETA International trade shows are managed for the association by Hopper Expos, an exposition management company in Middletown, OH.

AETA also serves the equestrian industry at-large by offering educational seminars and public awareness promotions held concurrently with its trade shows.  For example, AETA strongly supports the involvement of their  members in support of increased awareness of the use of equestrian helmets.

Governance
The organization is led by an elected volunteer Board of Directors and supported by an association management company.

AETA membership categories include: 

 Manufacturers: Corporately held membership for companies that manufacture or distribute equestrian-related products to retailers
 Retailers: Corporately held membership for companies who sell equestrian-related products to consumers
 Sales Representatives: Individually held membership for independent agents and representatives
 Industry Partners: Memberships for allied, industry associations and the media. 
 Industry Suppliers: Companies who sell products that retailers use in their sales and fulfillment operations or products that the equestrian trade community uses to conduct business and/or manufacture their products.  
 Affiliates: Members of the equestrian community and other interested individuals.

References

External links
 American Equestrian Trade Association
 Kansas Horse Council
 Horsetalk - minor discussion of trade fair
 Campus Equestrian

Trade associations based in the United States